The Jay Street Bridge crosses the West Branch Susquehanna River between Lock Haven on the south bank and Lockport on the north. Travelers using the bridge passed through an archway in the center of the toll house. The bridge included a covered pedestrian walkway on the downstream side.

After the wooden bridge was destroyed by fire in 1919, it was replaced by an iron bridge, and a steel girder bridge replaced the iron bridge in 1986. State Route 664, the southern terminus of which is in Lock Haven, crosses the river over the steel bridge.

The bridge is slightly upstream of Lock Haven's Canal Park, featuring remnants of the Bald Eagle Crosscut Canal. It is also slightly upstream of the Lock Haven Dam (also known as the Dunnstown Dam), built in the 19th century to provide water to the West Branch Canal, which ran parallel to the Lockport and Dunnstown side of the river.

In 2007, the average daily traffic count for the bridge was 3,646 vehicles.

See also
 List of crossings of the Susquehanna River

References

Works cited
 Miller, Isabel Winner (1966). Old Town: A History of Early Lock Haven, 1769–1845. Lock Haven: The Annie Halenbake Ross Library. .
 Wagner, ed., Dean R. (1979). Historic Lock Haven: An Architectural Survey. Lock Haven: Clinton County Historical Society. .

Covered bridges in Pennsylvania
Covered bridges in Clinton County, Pennsylvania
Wooden bridges in Pennsylvania
Bridges completed in 1852
Bridges in Clinton County, Pennsylvania
Road bridges in Pennsylvania
Former toll bridges in Pennsylvania
1852 establishments in Pennsylvania
Lock Haven, Pennsylvania